Saint Laura of Cordoba (died 864) was a Spanish abbess and martyr.

Saint Laura may also refer to:

 Saint Laura of Constantinople, abbess and martyr
 Laura Montoya (1874–1949), Colombian religious sister known for her work with Indigenous peoples
 Laura Vicuña (1891–1904), virgin and martyr